Siu-Yi Yung (1921–1974) is a former Chinese actress from Hong Kong. Yung is credited with over 135 films.

Early life 
In 1921, Yung was born as Yung Kam-chi in Shanghai, China. Yung's sister was Yuk-Yi Yung.

Career 
At age 14, Yung and her sister joined Plum Blossom Song and Dance Troupe. In 1938, Yung became an actress with Nanyang Film Company in Hong Kong. Yung first appeared as To Fa in The Purple Cups, a 1938 film directed by Hou Yao. Yung appeared as a lead actress in Breaking Through the Bronze Net, a 1939 Martial Arts film directed by Hung Suk-Wan. In 1952, Yung co-founded The Union Film Enterprise Ltd. Yung's last film is The Adventures of Courtship, a 1969 Comedy film directed by Cho Kei and Lee Hang. Yung is credited with over 135 films.

Filmography

Films 
This is a partial list of films.
 1938 The Purple Cups – To Fa
 1947 Yonder My Love 
 1952 The Prodigal Son – Fanny Luk 
 1953 Family – Kam 
 1953 Spring – Cousin 
 1954 Autumn – Cousin 
 1954 Spring's Flight – Cousin 
 1954 Sworn Sisters – Ah Sam 
 1956 Madam Mei 
 1958 Murderer in Town – Fa Mung-Na 
 1960 The Wonderful Partner 
 1961 Long Live the Money – Eighth concubine 
 1967 Confused Love 	 
 1967 My Darling Wife 	 
 1969 From Here to Eternity 	 	 
 1969 The Adventures of Courtship – Mrs. Lam

Personal life 
Yung's husband was Lee Ching. On March 17, 1974, Yung died from leukemia in Hong Kong.

References

External links 
 Yung Siu Yi at hkcinemagic.com
 Siu-Yee Yung at imdb.com
 Yung Siu Yi in 1938 at shaw.sg

1921 births
1974 deaths
Hong Kong film actresses
Chinese emigrants to British Hong Kong